Baasangiin Erdenebayar is a Mongolian international footballer. He made his first appearance for the Mongolia national football team in 2011.

References

Mongolian footballers
Mongolia international footballers
Living people
Association football defenders
Year of birth missing (living people)